Spanish Absolute Honesty Political Group (in Spanish: Grupo Político Honradez Absoluta Española) is a small political party in Spain. In the 2004 parliamentary elections GPHAE was the least voted party, with just 52 votes.

Political parties in Spain
Political parties with year of establishment missing